Okubo Dam is an earthfill dam located in Chiba Prefecture in Japan. The dam is used for water supply. The catchment area of the dam is 2 km2. The dam impounds about 4  ha of land when full and can store 326 thousand cubic meters of water. The construction of the dam was started on 1972 and completed in 1981.

References

Dams in Chiba Prefecture
1981 establishments in Japan